North San Pedro can refer to:
North San Pedro, Texas, a census-designated place of Nueces County, Texas
North San Pedro, San Jose, a neighborhood of San Jose, California